This is a list of cover versions of Beach Boys songs recorded by notable music artists. The Beach Boys were a critically and commercially successful band whose music is defined as being culturally significant. Through their immense influence, many notable artists began covering their original songs while various commemorative tribute albums have been created. Some of them feature song selections based on a certain era, particular album, or other thematic choice.

Artists who have covered songs from the solo career of the Beach Boys' members are not included.

Key

List

Footnotes

Sources

External links
Covers of Beach Boys songs on WhoSampled

Musical tributes to the Beach Boys
Beach Boys
Beach Boys covers